Grays Creek may refer to:

Grays Creek (Missouri)
Grays Creek (Cape Fear River tributary), a stream in Cumberland County, North Carolina
Grays Creek (Yadkin River tributary), a stream in Wilkes County, North Carolina
Grays Creek (Virginia)